The 1993 Volvo International was a men's tennis tournament played on outdoor hard courts at the Cullman-Heyman Tennis Center in New Haven, Connecticut, United States and was part of the Championship Series of the 1993 ATP Tour. It was the 21st edition of the tournament and ran from August 16 through August 23, 1993. Fifth-seeded Andriy Medvedev won the singles title.

Finals

Singles

 Andriy Medvedev defeated  Petr Korda, 7–5, 6–4 
 It was Medvedev's 3rd title of the year and the 6th of his career.

Doubles

 Cyril Suk /  Daniel Vacek defeated  Steve DeVries /  David Macpherson, 7–5, 6–4 
 It was Suk's 3rd title of the year and the 9th of his career. It was Vacek's only title of the year and the 4th of his career.

References

External links
 ITF tournament edition details